The Revolt of Cairo was a revolt that occurred on 21–22 October 1798 by the citizens of Cairo against the French occupation of Egypt led by Napoleon Bonaparte.

The revolt
In 1798, Napoleon led the French army into Egypt, swiftly conquering Alexandria and Cairo. However, in October of that year, discontent against the French led to an uprising by the people of Cairo. While Bonaparte was in Old Cairo, the city's population began spreading weapons around to one another and fortifying strongpoints, especially at the Al-Azhar Mosque. A French commander, Dominique Dupuy, was killed by the revolting Egyptians, as well as Bonaparte's Aide-de-camp, Joseph Sulkowski. Excited by the sheikhs and imams, many of the locals swore by the Prophet to exterminate all and any Frenchman they met, and all Frenchmen they encountered – at home or in the streets – were mercilessly slaughtered. Crowds rallied at the city gates to keep out Bonaparte, who was repulsed and forced to take a detour to get in via the Boulaq gate.

The French army's situation was critical – the British were threatening French control of Egypt after their victory at the Battle of the Nile, Murad Bey and his army were still in the field in Upper Egypt, and the generals Menou and Dugua were only just able to maintain control of Lower Egypt. The Ottoman peasants had common cause with those rising against the French in Cairo – the whole region was in revolt. A manifesto of the Great Lord was published widely throughout Egypt, stating:

The French responded by setting up cannons in the Citadel and firing them at areas containing rebel forces. During the night, French soldiers advanced around Cairo and destroyed any barricades and fortifications they came across. The rebels soon began to be pushed back by the strength of the French forces, gradually losing control of their areas of the city. Bonaparte personally hunted down rebels from street to street and forced them to seek refuge in the Al-Azhar Mosque. Bonaparte said that "He [i.e God] is too late – you've begun, now I will finish!". He then immediately ordered his cannon to open fire on the Mosque. The French broke down the gates and stormed into the building, massacring the inhabitants. At the end of the revolt 5,000 to 6,000 Egyptians were dead or wounded.

Aftermath

Back in absolute control of Cairo, Bonaparte sought out the authors and instigators of the revolt. Several sheikhs, along with various people of influence, were convicted of participation in the plot and executed. To complete his punishment, a heavy tax was placed upon the city and its divan was replaced by a military commission. To negate the effects of the Great Lord's firman, the French posted a proclamation in all the cities of Egypt under their control, ending in the words:

References

Sources
 Chandler, David G. (1966). The Campaigns of Napoleon. New York: Macmillan. .
 Pigeard, Alain (2004). Dictionnaire des batailles de Napoléon: 1796-1815, Paris: éditions Tallandier.

External links

French campaign in Egypt and Syria
Cairo, Revolt of
Cairo, Revolt of
Cairo, Revolt of
1798 in Egypt
History of Cairo
18th century in Cairo
Battles inscribed on the Arc de Triomphe